Ramón Michel Navarro Ceja (born January 16, 1998, in Santiago Ixcuintla, Nayarit) is a professional Mexican footballer who currently plays for FC Juárez on loan from Club Tijuana.

References

External links
 

1998 births
Living people
Mexican footballers
Association football midfielders
Dorados de Sinaloa footballers
FC Juárez footballers
Ascenso MX players
Liga Premier de México players
Footballers from Nayarit
People from Santiago Ixcuintla